Angel Maturino Reséndiz (August 1, 1959 – June 27, 2006), also known as The Railroad Killer, was a Mexican itinerant serial killer suspected in as many as 23 murders across the United States and Mexico during the 1990s. Some also involved sexual assault. He had become known as "The Railroad Killer," as most of his crimes were committed near railroads, where he had jumped off the trains which he was using to travel around the country.

On June 21, 1999, he briefly became the 457th fugitive listed by the FBI on its Ten Most Wanted Fugitives list, before he surrendered to the Texas authorities on July 13, 1999. He was convicted of capital murder in Texas, and executed by lethal injection in 2006.

Personal life
Ángel Leoncio Reyes Recendis was born in Izúcar de Matamoros, Puebla, Mexico.

Murders and methodology

By illegally jumping on and off trains within and across Mexico, Canada, and the United States, generally crossing borders illegally, Reséndiz was able to evade authorities for a considerable time. He used many aliases, but was chiefly known and sought after as Rafael Resendez-Ramirez. His birth name was Ángel Leoncio Reyes Recendis. United States government records show that he had been deported to Mexico at least four times since first entering the U.S. in 1973.

Reséndiz killed at least 15 people with rocks, a pickaxe, and other blunt objects, mainly in their homes. He was sometimes referred to as The Railway Killer or The Railcar Killer. After each murder, he would linger in the homes for a while, mainly to eat. Reséndiz took sentimental items, and also laid out the victims' driver's licenses to learn about their lives. He stole jewelry and other items, and gave them to his wife and mother, who lived in Rodeo, Durango, Mexico. Much of the jewelry was sold or melted down. After Reséndiz’s surrender, some of the stolen items that had been removed from his victims' homes were returned by his wife and mother. Money was sometimes left at the scene. He raped some of his female victims; however, rape was probably a secondary intent. Most of his victims were found covered with a blanket, or otherwise obscured from immediate view.

Victims

Reséndiz was tried and sentenced to death for the Benton murder.

Arrest and trial

Prior to surrendering at the El Paso bridge, the U.S. Border Patrol had arrested Reséndiz and deported him back to Mexico. Reséndiz's sister, Manuela, had seen her brother's FBI's Most Wanted Poster and feared that her brother might kill someone else, or be killed by the FBI, so she contacted the police. On July 12, 1999, a Texas Ranger, Drew Carter, accompanied by Manuela and a spiritual guide, met up with Reséndiz on a bridge connecting El Paso, Texas with Ciudad Juárez, Chihuahua. Reséndiz surrendered to Carter.

During a court appearance, Reséndiz accused Carter of lying under oath because Reséndiz's family was under the impression that he would be spared the death penalty. Reséndiz's ultimate fate, however, was decided by a jury, not Carter. In 1999, former Texas Attorney General Jim Mattox, wary of the controversy miring the many confessions and recantations by serial killer Henry Lee Lucas, remarked of Reséndiz, "I hope they don't start pinning on him every crime that happens near a railroad track."

Mental health
On June 21, 2006, a Houston judge ruled that Reséndiz was mentally competent to be executed. Upon hearing the judge's ruling, Reséndiz said, "I don't believe in death. I know the body is going to go to waste. But me, as a person, I'm eternal. I'm going to be alive forever." He also described himself as half-man and half-angel and told psychiatrists he could not be executed because he did not believe he could die. These and similar statements led Dr. Pablo Stewart, a bilingual psychiatrist who evaluated Reséndiz on two occasions in 2006, to conclude that Reséndiz was not then competent to be executed as "...delusions had completely taken over [Reséndiz's] thought processes..."

Execution

Despite an appeal pending with the 5th U.S. Circuit Court of Appeals, Reséndiz's death warrant was signed for the murder of Claudia Benton. He was housed in the Polunsky Unit in West Livingston, Texas awaiting execution. He was executed in the Huntsville Unit in Huntsville, Texas, on June 27, 2006, by lethal injection.

In his final statement, Reséndiz said, "I want to ask if it is in your heart to forgive me. You don't have to. I know I allowed the Devil to rule my life. I just ask you to forgive me and ask the Lord to forgive me for allowing the devil to deceive me. I thank God for having patience in me. I don't deserve to cause you pain. You do not deserve this. I deserve what I am getting." Reséndiz was pronounced dead at 8:05 p.m. CDT (01:05 UTC) on June 27, 2006. Claudia Benton's husband, George, was present at the execution and said Reséndiz was "evil contained in human form, a creature without a soul, no conscience, no sense of remorse, no regard for the sanctity of human life."

Media
The Reséndiz case was featured in:
 I Survived Season 1 Episode 6 LMN (Survivor Holly Dunn shared the story of her attack and the murder of Christopher Maier.)
 The FBI Files, "Tracks of a Killer", on the Biography Channel (2003) Reséndiz was the focus of the December 11, 2010, episode of 48 Hours Mystery (CBS), "Live to Tell: The Railroad Killer", in which Holly Dunn shared the story of her attack and the murder of Christopher Maier.
 A series of 16 podcasts released between October 2018 and February 2019 by British journalist Alex Hannaford and produced by Peter Sale for AudioBoom entitled Dead Man Talking. Hannaford interviewed Reséndiz on tape in 2003 when Reséndiz said he had committed many more murders than those mentioned in his trial and that innocent people were in jail for his crimes.
 "The Unbelievable Survival Story of Holly K Dunn" Episode 266, and "The Railroad Killer" Episode 268 of Morbid: A True Crime Podcast (2021).

See also 

 List of people executed in Texas, 2000–2009
 List of people executed in the United States in 2006
 List of serial killers by number of victims
 List of serial killers in the United States

Notes

References

External links
 The Rafael Resendez-Ramirez Case: A Review of the INS's Actions and the Operation of Its IDENT Automated Fingerprint Identification System (March 20, 2000) - U.S. Department of Justice
  - Alternate link
 

1959 births
2006 deaths
21st-century executions by Texas
Executed Mexican serial killers
FBI Ten Most Wanted Fugitives
Fugitives
Male serial killers
Mexican people convicted of murder
Mexican people executed abroad
Mexican rapists
People convicted of murder by Texas
People executed by Texas by lethal injection
People from Puebla